Manoj Kumar Pandey is an Indian politician and former cabinet minister of Uttar Pradesh from Samajwadi Party. He represents Raebareli district's Unchahar in the Uttar Pradesh Legislative Assembly.

Early life and education
He was born  in Raebareli. He completed his graduation from Feroze Gandhi College (Kanpur University). He was awarded honorary doctorate in Social Sciences from Sam Higginbottom Institute of Agriculture, Technology and Sciences in 2013.

References 

Samajwadi Party politicians
1968 births
Living people
Chhatrapati Shahu Ji Maharaj University alumni
Uttar Pradesh MLAs 2022–2027